Ghana Communication Technology University (GCTU) is a public technical university in Accra, Ghana founded in 2005.

The school was formerly known as Ghana Technology University College and Ghana Telecom University College. The change in name to Ghana Communication Technology University came with the passing of the Ghana Communication Technology University Bill in June 2020.

Summary 
The university provides bachelor's degrees and graduate programs, particularly in Telecommunications Engineering and Information and Communications Technologies. It also offers certificate programs, with courses that provide credit for the bachelor's degree, and other  professional development seminars and workshops.

Its school of Business opened in January 2009. First degrees in business include Bachelor of Science in Business and Bachelor of Science in Entrepreneurship. A Master of Science in Entrepreneurship and Technology is offered.

The school maintains partnership with Kwame Nkrumah University of Science & Technology (KNUST), Ghana; Coventry University, United Kingdom, AFRALTI, Kenya; The Open University, United Kingdom; DePaul University, USA; Aalborg University, Denmark; St. Mary's College of Maryland, USA; Antioch University, USA; University of California, Santa Barbara, California; Information Communication Technology (ICU), South Korea; University of Hertfordshire, United Kingdom; Wildau Institute of Technology, Germany.

Since its first class of 350 students matriculated in 2006, GTUC has increased its enrollment to about 7,000 students in 2017.

GTUC's main campus is in the Tesano section of Accra, Republic of Ghana. A second campus has been opened in nearby Abeka, a nearby Accra suburb and a satellite campus at Nungua. Apart from Accra there are satellite campuses in Kumasi, Takoradi, Koforidua and Ho.

The 9-member University Council comprising distinguished educators, business executives and government officials was inaugurated on August 23, 2010.

Mr Nii Adotei Abrahams has been appointed as the new Registrar of the university for one term, which is a 4-year period (August 2020 - July 2024) . He takes over from Dr Mrs Juliana Owusu-Ansah who served for two terms (October 2012 - September 2020).

See also 
List of universities in Ghana
Ghana

References

Universities in Ghana
Scientific organisations based in Ghana
Educational institutions established in 2005
2005 establishments in Ghana
Education in Accra